Martlet is an English heraldic charge depicting a stylized bird of the swallow family.

Martlet may also refer to:

Technology
 Martlet (CU Spaceflight), a project of CU Spaceflight to develop a small rocket which can be launched from a balloon
 Martlet 3, and other Martlet projectiles during the US/Canada High Altitude Research Project (Project HARP)
 Southern Martlet, single-seat biplane sports aircraft
 Grumman Martlet, the original name given to Royal Navy Grumman F4F-4 Wildcat carrier fighters
 Martlet (missile), a rocket powered missile

Other uses
 The Martlet, a student newspaper at the University of Victoria in Victoria, British Columbia, Canada
 McGill Martlets, the women's athletic teams that represent McGill University in Montreal, Quebec, Canada
 Martlet House, a building which was the Montreal headquarters of the Seagram Company
 Operation Martlet, a British diversionary operation in the Second World War in June 1944 in France